Children's television series (or children's television shows) are television programs designed for children, normally scheduled for broadcast during the morning and afternoon when children are awake. They can sometimes run during the early evening, allowing younger children to watch them after school. The purpose of these shows is mainly to entertain or educate. The children's series are in four categories: those aimed at infants and toddlers, those aimed at those aged 6 to 11 years old, those for adolescents and those aimed at all children.

History
Children's television is nearly as old as television itself. The BBC's Children's Hour, broadcast in the UK in 1946, is generally credited with being the first TV programme specifically for children.

Television for children tended to originate from similar programs on radio; the BBC's Children's Hour was launched in 1922, and BBC School Radio began broadcasting in 1924. In the US in the early 1930s, adventure serials such as Little Orphan Annie began to emerge, becoming a staple of children's afternoon radio listening.

History in the United States
Early children's shows included Kukla, Fran and Ollie (1947), Howdy Doody, and Captain Kangaroo. Many of the earliest Westerns were targeted at a children's audience, stemming back to when children's radio serials often were set in a Western setting. Ding Dong School, which aired from 1952 to 1965, was one of the first attempts to produce educational programming for very young children; its creator and host, Frances Horwich, would sit in front of the camera and simulate small talk with the viewing audience at home, demonstrating basic skills for the camera. Winky Dink and You took a more interactive approach, prompting its viewers to affix a clear vinyl screen to their television and draw pictures to match what was going on on-screen; safety concerns and widespread reports of children drawing directly on the television screen and causing damage led to that show's end in 1957. Later shows for very young children include Sesame Street, The Electric Company and Mister Rogers' Neighborhood. In the 1990s, more children's television series such as Barney & Friends, Blue's Clues, SpongeBob SquarePants, Bear in the Big Blue House, and The Big Comfy Couch were created.

Role of advertising

In the United States, early children's television was often a marketing branch of a larger corporate product and it rarely contained any educational elements (for instance, The Magic Clown, a popular early children's program, was primarily an advertisement for Bonomo's Turkish taffy product). In the early years of television, advertising to children posed a dilemma, as most children have no disposable income of their own, making them less than ideal candidates for advertising targets; as such, children's television was not a particularly high priority for the networks.

This practice continued, albeit in a much toned-down manner, through the 1980s in the United States, when the Federal Communications Commission prohibited tie-in advertising on broadcast television. These regulations do not apply to cable, which is out of the reach of the FCC's content regulations. Due to the success of He-Man and the Masters of the Universe, the 1980s saw a dramatic rise in toyline-centered television programs, including animated series such as G.I. Joe: A Real American Hero, M.A.S.K., My Little Pony, and She-Ra: Princess of Power, a spinoff of He-Man.

The effect of advertising to children remains heavily debated and extensively studied.

Later non-educational children's television programs included the science fiction programmes of Irwin Allen (most notably Lost in Space), the fantasy series of Sid and Marty Krofft, the extensive cartoon empire of Hanna-Barbera and the numerous sitcoms that aired as part of TGIF in the 1990s, many of these programs fit a broader description of family-friendly television, targeting a broad demographic that includes adults without excluding children.

Commercial-free children television was first introduced with Sesame Street on PBS in November 1969, it was produced by what is now known as Sesame Workshop (formerly CTW).

Saturday morning cartoon blocks

In the United States, Saturday mornings were generally scheduled with cartoon from the 1960s to 1980s as viewership with that programming would pull in 20 million watchers which dropped to 2 million in 2003. In 1992, teen comedies and a "Today" show weekend edition were first to displace the cartoon blocks on NBC. Starting in September 2002, the networks turned to their affiliated cable cartoon channels or outside programmers for their blocks. The other two Big Three television networks soon did the same. Infomercials replaced the cartoon on Fox in 2008.

The Saturday cartoons were less of a draw due to the various cable cartoon channels (Nickelodeon, Disney Channel, Cartoon Network, etc.) being available all week starting in the 1990s. Recordable options became more prevalent in the 1990s with videocassette recorder and then its 21st-century replacements of DVDs, DVRs and streaming services. FCC rule changes in the 1990s regarding the E/I programming and limitation on kid-focus advertising made the cartoons less profitable. Another possible contributor is the rising divorce rate and the following children's visitation pushed more "quality time" with the kids instead of TV watching.

On September 27, 2014, the last traditional Saturday network morning cartoon block, Vortexx, ended and was replaced the following week by the syndicated One Magnificent Morning on The CW.

Demographics
Children's television series can target a wide variety of key demographics; the programming used to target these demographics varies by age and gender. Few television networks target infants and toddlers under two years of age, in part due to widespread opposition to the practice. Children's programming can be targeted toward persons 2 to 11 years of age; in practice, this is further divided into the preschool demographic (2 to 6 years old) and the older children or preteen/tween demographic (6 to 11 years old).

Preschool-oriented programming is generally more overtly educational. In a number of cases, such shows are produced in consultation with educators and child psychologists in an effort to teach age-appropriate lessons (the series Sesame Street pioneered this approach when it debuted in 1969). Adaptations of illustrated children's book series are one subgenre of shows targeted at younger children. A format that has increased in popularity since the 1990s (see, for example, Thomas & Friends (1984-2021), Blue's Clues (1996-2006), Teletubbies (1997-2001, 2015-2018), Dora the Explorer (2000-2014, 2019), Pocoyo (2005-present), Mickey Mouse Clubhouse (2006-2016), and Numberblocks (2017-2021)) is the "pseudo-interactive" program, in which the action of the show stops and breaks the fourth wall to give a young viewer the opportunity to answer a question or dilemma put forth on the show, with the action continuing as if the viewer answered correctly.

Shows that target the demographic of persons 6 to 11 years old focus primarily on entertainment and can range from comedic cartoons (with an emphasis on slapstick) to action series. Most children's television series targeting this age range are animated (with a few exceptions, perhaps the best-known being the long-running Power Rangers franchise), and many often specifically target boys (especially in the case of action series), girls or sometimes both. Efforts to create educational programming for this demographic have had a mixed record of success; although such series made up the bulk of educational programming on broadcast television in the first decade of the 2000s, they also tend to have very low viewership. PBS had somewhat greater success with its now defunct educational programming block, PBS Kids GO!, that targets this demographic.

The teen demographic targets viewers 12 to 17 years of age. Live-action series that target this demographic are more dramatic and developed, including teen dramas and teen sitcoms. In some cases, they may contain more mature content that is usually not permissible on shows targeting younger viewers, and can include some profanity or suggestive dialogue. animation shows are also used to targeting this kind of demographic; cartoons that are aimed at teenagers generally feature more crude humor than those oriented toward younger children. Educational programming targeted at this demographic has historically been rare, other than on NASA TV's education block; this has somewhat changed with Litton Entertainment's entry into educational television in the early 2010s, as Litton's programs exploited a loophole in U.S. regulations that allows teen-oriented programs to be counted as educational but not be subject to restrictions on advertising for children's programs. However, some programming aimed at the demographic has had some tangential educational value in regards to social issues, such as the now-defunct TNBC block of sitcoms, which often tackled issues such as underage drinking or drug use.

Gender targeting
In a study titled "Four-Year-Olds’ Beliefs About How Others Regard Males and Females," researcher May Ling Halim observed how television viewing and interactions of parents within a household may affect a child's perception on gender. She had about 250 four-year-olds interviewed and she asked them questions about their parents, the opposite gender, how much TV they watched and about their feelings on their own gender. The study used four-year-olds because at age four, children are able to make distinctions concerning gender and concerning how two people may view the same thing in different ways. The results of the study showed that for the most part, children were shielded from society's gender hierarchy. Each seemed to favor their own gender which is typical of little kids. Household hierarchy as well as exposure to TV increased children's awareness of the gender hierarchies that are present in the adult world. Halim also observed how society's higher valuing of males could affect how children approach pathways to academics and occupations later in their lives.

Whether the shows are from Nickelodeon or from the Disney Channel, there are many instances where boys and girls are cast in typical roles that are recognized widely by society and a large percentage of the world. While there are many studies that have been done exploring the topic of children's perceptions of gender through television, there are few pieces of concrete evidence that tell people that what children are watching is actually harmful to them.

LGBTQ representation

For years, Broadcast Standards and Practices departments of networks, Parental Guidelines, and campaigns by social conservatives limited "efforts to make kids animation more inclusive." While some executives blame these as reasons their shows aren't as inclusive as they could be, those who work on shows say they felt pressure from networks and studios to "be less overt with LGBTQ characters or avoid depicting elements of LGBTQ culture altogether." One former executive of Disney, David Levine, said that "a lot of conservative opinion" drove what was depicted on Cartoon Network, Disney Channel, and other alike channels. Some argued that cable television, which began to pick up in the 1990s, "opened the door for more representation" even though various levels of approvals remained.

Through the 2000s, GLAAD bemoaned the lack of LGBT representation. In 2014, when GLAAD continued to argue that "children's programming has been slow to reflect the diversity its audience is experiencing in its daily life." Two years later, they recorded the highest number of LGBTQ characters they ever recorded up to that point. In 2017, some said that LGBTQ+ characters in animated television were somewhat rare, despite the fact that GLAAD praised the number of characters in broadcast and primetime television.

From 2017 to 2019, Insider noted that there was a "more than 200% spike in queer and gender-minority characters in children's animated TV shows." In 2018 and 2019, GLAAD stated that Amazon, Hulu, and Netflix, had increased LGBTQ representation in "daytime kids and family television." In May 2019, Ashley Fetters and Natalie Escobar argued, in The Atlantic, that the episode of Arthur where two male characters got married "marks a poignant moment in children's TV history" since you can count on kids shows with gay characters, mentioning specifically Adventure Time, Steven Universe, The Legend of Korra, Gravity Falls, Clarence, and The Loud House. In December 2020, Amy Friedman, head of programming for Cartoon Network and HBO Max Kids & Family, stated that they are looking "at ourselves across the inclusion and equity spectrum" including LGBTQ+, to evaluate projects in production, development, and which have been greenlighted. In their January 2021 report, GLAAD praised LGBTQ representation in episodes of DuckTales, The Owl House and Adventure Time: Distant Lands.

In October 2020, Rebecca Sugar, creator of Steven Universe, said that she loved being able to place her experiences in a different context "through a nonbinary lens" when writing characters for the show. In June 2021, Sugar told NPR that one of her motivators for the show was making sure "nonbinary, gender-expansive kids...have a show." In March 2021, Sugar told Vanity Fair that she had been determined to make "queer couples and narratives" integral to the story in ways that are "impossible to censor," and had to fight internally for the representation. In June 2021, Taneka Stotts, a genderfluid writer for Steven Universe Future told Insider that Sugar "went out of the way to make sure that their show was [staffed] as inclusive as possible", hiring talented people notice on Tumblr and Twitter instead of industry regulars. Sugar explained that being at the forefront of LGBTQ representation meant that beyond what they were creating there was "very little queer content" and said she feared that her identity and content in the show could lead to its cancellation if she spoke about it openly, noting that support for the show was "often very qualified and hurtful".

Some, like journalist Abbey White, have argued that these shows are the "last battleground for LGBTQ representation," saying that if it can be in these shows, there is no excuse for it not being anywhere else in media, citing Danger & Eggs, Steven Universe, and She-Ra and the Princesses of Power as examples. White further said that it is "exciting to see people queering their entire narratives in ways" that reach children and a "broader audience." They and Kalai White also noted that shows run by showrunners who are queer, non-binary, or trans are "largely responsible for the influx of nonbinary and trans characters in kids' animation," while facing challenges to adding more representation to their shows. Despite this, White stated that more than 90% of LGBTQ characters in kid's animated shows within Insider's database of characters in children's animated television shows "require either a cable, satellite, streaming, or internet subscription to view them on first airing."

History in the rest of the world
Children's television is created for many markets, with notable successes like Play School, Noggin the Nog, Thunderbirds, Mr. Men and Thomas & Friends originating from the UK, Le Manege Enchantè from France,  The Singing Ringing Tree from Germany, and Marine Boy from Japan.

Canadian studio Nelvana is a particularly prolific producer of children's programming. Much of Nelvana's product is broadcast worldwide, especially in the US, where the similarities in dialect require without any dubbing or localization.

Channels

United States
In the United States, there are three major commercial cable networks dedicated to children's television. All three also operate secondary services with specialized scopes drawing upon their respective libraries, such as a focus on specific demographics, or a focus upon classic programming that fall within their scope and demographics; all three have also extensively franchised their brands outside the United States.
 Nickelodeon, the first children's television channel, launched in 1979 (though its history traces back to the 1977 launch of QUBE's C-3 channel); it consists largely of original series aimed at children, preteens and young teenagers, including animated series, to live-action comedy and action series, as well as series aimed at preschoolers, and appeals to adult and adolescent audiences with a lineup of mainly live-action sitcom reruns and a limited amount of original programming on Nick at Nite.
 Nickelodeon operates four digital cable and satellite channels separate from the main service: Nick Jr., a channel devoted to preschool programming;  Nicktoons, which primarily (although not exclusively) runs animated programming; NickMusic, a pop music video service branded as "MTV Hits" prior to 2016; and TeenNick, a channel devoted to live-action programming. This is in addition to a flexible number of free digital channels under the Nickelodeon brand on parent company Paramount Global's over-the-top service Pluto TV. Subscription video on demand service Paramount+ includes much of the Nickelodeon archives.
 Cartoon Network, launched in 1992, is devoted primarily to animated programming. It primarily targets children 6–14, while its early morning Cartoonito is aimed at preschoolers and kindergarteners aged 2–6, and its overnight daypart block Adult Swim targets older teenagers and young adults, 18–34.
 Cartoon Network operates one digital cable: Boomerang, a channel that specializes in programs centered around classic brands that parent company Warner Bros. Discovery owns (particularly Hanna-Barbera, MGM and Warner Bros. Animation), along with some imported programs, reruns of Cartoon Network original programs, and burn-off properties.
 Disney Channel launched in 1983 as a premium channel; it consists of original first-run television series, theatrically released and original made-for-cable movies, and select other third-party programming. Disney Channel – which formerly operated as a pay-TV service – originally marketed its programs towards families during the 1980s, and later at younger children by the 1990s, and primarily at teenybopper females aged 13–16 between 2006 and 2017, before returning to families.
 Disney Channel operates two digital channels separate from the main service: Disney Junior, which launched in 2011 and primarily broadcasts animated series catered towards a preschool audience, and Disney XD, which caters primarily to an older youth audience with an action-oriented focus. Disney does not have a traditional television outlet for its archival programming, which it has historically kept in a proverbial vault with limited access; much of its programming is available through Disney+, a subscription video on demand service. Disney also operates Freeform, a channel primarily carrying live-action programming catered towards a teenage/young adult audience. Although its previous incarnations under other owners had family-oriented formats and children's programming, they have since been phased out in favor of series such as teen dramas, some coming from Disney Channel.

Under current mandates, all broadcast television stations in the United States must show a minimum of three hours per week of educational children's programming, regardless of format. Until 2019, this rule also applied to digital subchannels; as a result, digital multicast networks whose formats should not fit children's programming, such as Live Well Network and TheCoolTV, were required to carry educational programs to fit the FCC mandates. (The rule for digital subchannels was repealed in July 2019; in practice, most still carry educational programs anyway.) In 2017, there was a programming block that aired on syndication called KidsClick; it was notable as a concerted effort to program children's shows on television without regard to their educational content, one of the first such efforts since the E/I rule took effect. The transition to digital television has allowed for the debut of whole subchannels that air children's programming 24/7; examples include BabyFirst, Discovery Family, HBO Kids, PBS Kids, Smile, and Universal Kids. The country's only directly nationally operated TV service for public consumption, NASA TV, also includes educational programs in its schedule for use in schools.

Canada

English-language children's specialty channels in Canada are primarily owned by Corus Entertainment and WildBrain. Corus operates YTV, Treehouse, and Teletoon, as well as localized versions of the Cartoon Network, Disney Channel, Disney Junior, Disney XD, and Nickelodeon brands. WildBrain operates Family Channel, as well as the spin-off services Chrgd and Family Jr. it has been majority owned and operated by British Columbia's public broadcaster Knowledge Network.

In French, Corus operates Télétoon and La chaîne Disney, WildBrain operates Télémagino (a French version of Family Jr.), TVA Group operates the preschool-oriented Yoopa, and Bell Media runs the teen-oriented Vrak.  Via its majority-owned subsidiary Telelatino, Corus also operates two children and family-oriented networks in Spanish and Italian, TeleNiños and Telebimbi respectively.

On broadcast television and satellite to cable undertakings, children's television content is relegated to the country's public and designated provincial educational broadcasters, including CBC Television and Ici Radio-Canada Télé, as well as City Saskatchewan, CTV Two Alberta (formerly Access), Knowledge Network, Télé-Québec, TFO, and TVOntario (TVOKids).

Aided by the cultural similarities between Canada and the US, along with film credits and subsidies available from the Canadian government, a large number of animated children's series have been made in Canada with the intention of exporting them to the United States. Such programs carry a prominent Government of Canada wordmark in their closing credits.

United Kingdom

The BBC and ITV plc both operate children's oriented television networks on digital terrestrial television: the BBC runs CBBC as well as the preschool-oriented CBeebies, while ITV runs CITV as well as the preschool-oriented LittleBe, as a programming block on ITVBe. Both channels were spun off from children's television strands on their respective flagship channels (BBC One, BBC Two, and ITV). The BBC and ITV have largely phased out children's programming from their main channels in order to focus on the dedicated services; in 2012, as part of the "Delivering Quality First" initiative, the BBC announced that it would end the broadcast of CBBC programmes on BBC One following the completion of the transition to digital terrestrial television, citing low viewership in comparison to broadcasts of the programmes on the CBBC channel. Channel 5 also broadcasts a preschool-oriented block known as Milkshake!, while its owner, Paramount Networks International, also runs versions of Nickelodeon and its sister networks Nicktoons and Nick Jr.

Narrative Capital operate a number of children's channels under the Pop and Tiny Pop brands. British versions of Cartoon Network and its sister channels Boomerang and Cartoonito also operate in the country. some 25 years after the initial launch.

Ireland
Ireland has one dedicated children's TV service RTÉjr. Since 1998 RTÉ2 has provided children's programming from 07:00 to 17:30 each weekday, original titled The Den, the service was renamed TRTÉ and RTÉjr in 2010. Irish-language service TG4 provide two strands of children's programming Cúla 4 Na nÓg and Cúla 4 during the day. Commercial broadcaster TV3 broadcast a children's strand called Gimme 3 from 1998 - 1999. And then broadcast a new strand called 3Kids.

Australia
Children's channels that exist in Australia are ABC Me, ABC Kids, KidsCo, Disney Channel and its spin-off Disney Junior, CBeebies, Nickelodeon and its spin-off Nick Jr., and Cartoon Network and its spin-off Boomerang.

Japan

Children's channels that exist in Japan are NHK Educational TV, Kids Station, Disney Channel, Disney XD, Nickelodeon (also under a block on Animax, known as "Nick Time") and Cartoon Network (Cartoon Network's age demographic is moving towards older viewers with shows such as Hello Kitty, Regular Show and Adventure Time)

Iceland
One of the most well-known children's TV programmes comes from Iceland, LazyTown, was created by Magnus Scheving, European Gymnastics Champion and CEO of LazyTown Entertainment. The show has aired in over 180 countries, been dubbed into more than 32 languages and is the most expensive children's show of all time.

India
In 1995, Cartoon Network became the first children's channel to be launched in India. Subsequently, Disney Channel and Nickelodeon arrived. Hungama TV (2004) was the first children's channel that had local content. Pogo and BabyTV came later in 2006. By 2018, 23 channels have aired in India.

Romania
Nickelodeon was the first children's channel in Romania, launched in December 1998. Afterwards, Minimax became the first Romanian children's channel to air locally produced content, launched on Children's Day in 2001. Since then, channels like BabyTV and Disney Channel have arrived.

Turkey

Children's channels that exist in Turkey are Disney Channel, Cartoon Network, TRT Çocuk, MinikaÇOCUK, Minika GO and Zarok TV.

See also
 List of local children's television series (United States)
 Saturday-morning cartoon for an in-depth history of children's television in the United States
 Advertising to children

References

Citations

Sources

External links 
 Children's Television, online exhibition from screenonline, a website of the British Film Institute
 The 1950s–2000s Week-By-Week - includes listings and factoids for local/national children's shows.
 The future of children's digital television - an interview with Gloria Tristani 
 Ryan Black, The Surprising Maturity of Children's Animation, The Reporter, March 4, 2016

 
Television by interest

Television genres